Gabersdorf is a municipality in the district of Leibnitz in the Austrian state of Styria.

Geography
Gabersdorf lies east of Leibnitz between the east Styrian hills and the Mur river.

References

Cities and towns in Leibnitz District